Stephacidin A  and B are antitumor alkaloids isolated from the fungus Aspergillus ochraceus  that belong to a class of naturally occurring 2,5-diketopiperazines.  This unusual family of fungal metabolites are complex bridged 2,5-diketopiperazine alkaloids that possess a unique bicyclo[2.2.2]diazaoctane core ring system and are constituted mainly from tryptophan, proline, and substituted proline derivatives where the olefinic unit of the isoprene moiety has been formally oxidatively cyclized across the α-carbon atoms of a 2,5-diketopiperazine ring.
The molecular architecture of stephacidin B, formally a dimer   of avrainvillamide, reveals a complex dimeric prenylated N-hydroxyindole alkaloid that contains 15 rings and 9 stereogenic centers and is one of the most complex indole alkaloids isolated from fungi. Stephacidin B rapidly converts into the electrophilic monomer avrainvillamide in cell culture, and there is evidence that the monomer avrainvillamide interacts with intracellular thiol-containing proteins, most likely by covalent modification.

Avrainvillamide, which contains a 3-alkylidene-3H-indole 1-oxide function, was identified in culture media from various strains of Aspergillus and is reported to exhibit
antimicrobial activity against multidrug-resistant bacteria.
The avrainvillamide and stephacidins family of structurally complex anticancer natural products are active against the human colon HCT 116 cell line.
The signature bicyclo[2.2.2]diazaoctane ring system common to these alkaloids has inspired numerous synthetic approaches.

References

External links
 Stephacidin A and B: two structurally novel, selective inhibitors of the testosterone-dependent prostate LNCaP cells
 PubChem - Stephacidin A
PubChem - C6-epi-Stephacidin A
PubChem - Stephacidin B

Diketopiperazines
Indole alkaloids